Lewis Colick is an American screenwriter born in Brooklyn, New York. He attended Baruch College in New York and got his MFA in Theatre Arts from the UCLA Film School.

Filmography
The Dirt Bike Kid (1985)
Crossing the Mob (1988) (TV)
Unlawful Entry (1992)
Judgment Night (1993)
Radiant City (1996) (TV)
Bulletproof (1996)
Ghosts of Mississippi (1996)
Dante's Peak (1997) (Uncredited)
October Sky (1999)
Along Came a Spider (2001) (Uncredited)
Hardball (2001) (Uncredited)
Domestic Disturbance (2001)
Beyond the Sea (2004)
Ladder 49 (2004)
Charlie St. Cloud (2010)

External links
 

Living people
Brooklyn College alumni
American male screenwriters
Year of birth missing (living people)